Kalavani is a 2010 Indian Tamil-language romantic comedy film written and directed by newcomer A. Sarkunam. It stars Vimal and debutante Oviya, with Saranya Ponvannan, Ganja Karuppu and Ilavarasu in supporting roles. The film was made on a shoe-string budget, and released on 25 June 2010. and became a sleeper hit of 2010. Later the movie was remade in Kannada as Kirataka with Oviya reprising her role.

Plot

Two villages in Thanjavur area are always at loggerheads with each other, and it spills even to T20 cricket match between kids from both villages. Arivazhagan aka Arikki (Vimal) is a wayward son of Lakshmi (Saranya Ponvannan), who is in awe but at the same time fears him. Her husband Ramasamy (Ilavarasu) is away in Dubai, and a large part of the money he sends home is taken away by Arikki using extortionist methods, such as threatening to break the TV set at home. He is yet to pass his 12th standard. Arikki spends time in bars with friends, teases girls, asks them to profess their love for him, and gets into brawls after conning others. He meets Maheshwari (Oviya) and wants her to declare her love for him, which she finally confesses. He abducts her, and they eventually marry. Her brother Ilango (Thirumurugan) is a tough guy who has an axe to grind against Arikki and his gang, which leads to the twist in the climax. Ilango, fuming with rage, is out to slice him into pieces. Does he do that? If he did not, then how did Arikki manage to avert that? All this is answered in an interesting climax that is pleasantly humorous.

Cast
 Vimal as Arivazhagan (Arikki)
 Oviya as Maheshwari (Mahesh)
 Saranya Ponvannan as Lakshmi
 Ganja Karuppu as Panchayathu
 Ilavarasu as Ramasamy
 Soori as Manikandan
 Sujatha Sivakumar as Rajee
 Thirumurugan as Ilango
 Antony as Arikki's friend
 Kannan as Florist
 Kalaiarasan as supporting comedian
Mu Ramaswamy as Maheshwari's Elder Paternal Uncle

Production
A. Sarkunam approached K. Bhagyaraj with his script, and asked for help in improving the script and for Bhagayraj's son Shanthanu to play the lead role. Sarkunam later moved away from Bhagayraj citing that his producer was uncomfortable with the potential salary that Shanthanu may have expected.

Soundtrack
The film score and soundtrack for Kalavani was composed by S. S. Kumaran. The album consists of seven tracks featuring lyrics penned by Na. Muthukumar. The song "Oru Murai" was well received and was retained in the Kannada remake.

Release

Critical reception
Kalavani generally opened to positive reviews. Bhamadevi Ravi from The Times of India gave 4/5 and calling it "a complete entertainer." Sify rated the movie 4 out of 5 and stated that "Kalavani is a knockout entertainer set in a rural milieu." A critic from Top10Cinema wrote that "Kalavani is a blatant revision of Bharathiraja's yesteryear films based on villager's conflicts and guy-gal falling in love." Gautaman Bhaskaran of Hindustan Times gave it 3/5 and wrote that "Kalavani is a canvas of delightful rural romance."

Remakes
Following the film's success, director Gautham Vasudev Menon's Photon Kathaas has acquired the film's rights to remake it other languages. It was remade in Kannada as Kirataka with Oviya being retained as the female lead. It was also remade in Telugu as Umapathi in 2022.

Litigation
Seven years after the film's release, the Chennai branch of the Censor Board Of Film Certification (CBFC) was served a notice by the High Court after a minor pregnant girl told the court that she obtained inspiration from the film Kalavani. The girl's parents claimed that the censor board had acted negligently in giving the film a U certificate.

Sequel
A sequel, Kalavani 2, was announced in 2016.

References

External links
 

2010 films
2010 romantic comedy films
Tamil films remade in other languages
2010s Tamil-language films
Indian romantic comedy films
2010 directorial debut films
Films directed by A. Sarkunam